Hilary Jones may refer to:

Hilary Jones (doctor) (born 1953), British general practitioner and media doctor
Hilary P. Jones (1863–1938), United States Navy officer 
Hilary Bevan Jones (born 1952), British television producer

See also
USS Hilary P. Jones (DD-427), Benson-class destroyer in the United States Navy during World War II